Daniel or Dan(ny) Walters may refer to:

Danny Walters (American football) (born 1960), American football player
Nathaniel Walters (1875–1956), commonly known as Danny Walters, rugby player
Danny Walters (actor) (born 1993), British actor
Dan Walters (1966–2020), baseball player

See also
Daniel Waters (disambiguation)